The Hopman Cup XXVIII was the 28th edition of the Hopman Cup tournament between nations in men's and women's tennis. It took place at the Perth Arena in Perth, Western Australia.

Eight teams competed for the title, with two round robin groups of four, from which the top team of each group advanced to the final. For the first time, there were two Australian teams, Australia Green (representing 25 and under) and Australia Gold (representing the veterans). The original full line-up of entrants was announced in October. Originally, Lleyton Hewitt and Casey Dellacqua were supposed to represent Australia Gold, but Dellacqua was replaced by Jarmila Wolfe. Other replacements are Kenny de Schepper for Gaël Monfils in the French team, Karolína Plíšková for Lucie Šafářová in the Czech team.

The 2015 champions Poland did not return to defend their title.
The competition was won by Australia Green.

Entrants

Seeds

Replacement players

Group stage

Group A
All times are local (UTC+8).

Standings

Australia Gold vs. Czech Republic

Ukraine vs. United States

Czech Republic vs. Ukraine

Australia Gold vs. United States

 Serena Williams was unable to participate in the mixed doubles rubber, Aus Gold was awarded a 6–0, 6–0 win. However, a match was still played in which the score was 77-64, 6–1 to Australia (see above).

Australia Gold vs. Ukraine

Czech Republic vs. United States

Group B
All times are local (UTC+8).

Standings

Australia Green vs. Germany

Great Britain vs. France

France vs. Germany

Australia Green vs. Great Britain

Great Britain vs. Germany

Australia Green vs. France

Final

Ukraine vs. Australia Green 

The mixed doubles event was not played in the final, as Australia Green had won both singles matches.

Broadcast
Selected matches aired in Australia on either 7mate or 7Two, with live coverage of both day and night sessions. Every match was also available to be streamed live through a free 7Tennis mobile app.

References

External links
 Official Site

Hopman Cup
Hopman Cups by year
2016 in Australian tennis
Hopman Cup